Beaufortia leveretti is a species of ray-finned fish in the genus Beaufortia.

Distribution and status
It is native to fast-flowing streams of Red and Pearl River systems in China and Vietnam and to Hainan Island. It inhabits Japan, North Korea, South Korea and Vietnam and it has been introduced to Singapore. It is found in large rivers and streams, in shallow water over sandy bottom. Its maximum length is  but it is usually much smaller. In 2010, the status was changed from Data Deficient to Least Concern as this fish has a widespread range and no known threats.

It is fished but has low economic value. However, there are still unknown details such as population, threats and conservation measures.

References

Beaufortia (fish)
Freshwater fish of China
Fish of Vietnam
Marine fish of Asia
Fish described in 1927